Bad Girls is the seventh studio album by American singer-songwriter Donna Summer. It was released on April 25, 1979, by Casablanca Records. Originally issued as a double album, Bad Girls became the best-selling and most critically acclaimed album of Summer's career (before the release of On The Radio: Greatest Hits Volumes I & II). It was also her final studio album for Casablanca Records. In 2003, Universal Music re-issued Bad Girls as a digitally remastered and expanded deluxe edition.

Bad Girls reached the top of the US Billboard 200, where it stayed for six weeks: for one week on June 16, 1979, and then for five consecutive weeks, from July 7 to August 4, 1979. Bad Girls also topped the Billboard R&B Albums chart for three weeks, from June 23 to July 7, 1979, and all cuts from the album topped the Disco Top 80 for seven weeks, from May 26 to July 7, 1979. It contained the US Billboard Hot 100 number-one hits "Hot Stuff" and "Bad Girls", and the number-two hit "Dim All the Lights". Summer also achieved further success when she became the first female artist to have two songs in the top three of the Billboard Hot 100, when on the week of June 30, 1979, "Hot Stuff" fell to number two and "Bad Girls" rose to number three.

Bad Girls was universally acclaimed and was certified platinum—now double platinum—by the Recording Industry Association of America (RIAA) within just a week of its release. At the 1980 Grammy Awards, Bad Girls was nominated for Album of the Year and Best Female Pop Vocal Performance and "Hot Stuff" won Best Female Rock Vocal Performance. Additionally, "Dim All the Lights" was nominated for Best Female R&B Vocal Performance and "Bad Girls" was nominated for Best Disco Recording.

Bad Girls is widely considered one of the greatest disco albums. It was ranked by Rolling Stone's list of the Women Who Rock: The 50 Greatest Albums of All Time at number 23, where the magazine wrote, "The late great Queen of Disco pulls out all the stops for an album that sums up Seventies radio, from ladies-choice smooch jams to filthy funk." In a BBC Music review of the album, Daryl Easla wrote, "Bad Girls is a fantastic reminder of when [Summer] was the Madonna, Whitney, Tina, Diana, Barbra, Aretha, Mariah, Beyonce, Taylor, including Britney, Christina, Mary J and Missy of her day all rolled into one. No one compares to her as she mastered voice versatility with more than ten voices singing all genres". Part of the song Our Love, also available as a B-side, was copied by New Order on Blue Monday.

Background
Having made her name in the preceding years as "the queen of disco," Summer set to work on her new album with long-time partners Giorgio Moroderand Pete Bellotte, as well as various others she had not worked with before. By this time, although disco music was still popular, other styles such as punk and heavy metal were also doing well on the charts, so the team decided to incorporate a rockier sound into some of the songs. Other songs had a more soul/R&B feel to them, and in all it was probably Summer's most diverse album to date. The fusion of rock and disco was particularly evident, and synthesizers were used to augment the sound for a more electronic and dance oriented electro music in the first two songs on the album – "Hot Stuff" and "Bad Girls", which also became the first two singles to be released from the album. Both were huge hits and made number one on the American singles chart. The former also won Summer a Grammy Award for Best Female Rock Vocal Performance and became popular again in the 1990s when it was featured in The Full Monty and again in the film The Martian. "Dim All the Lights" was the third single and also became a huge hit, peaking at number two in the U.S.

Release and reception

Bad Girls was universally acclaimed by music reviews. As well as the winner of the aforementioned Grammy Award for "Hot Stuff" (Best Female Rock Vocal Performance). The song "Bad Girls" was also nominated for Best Disco Recording. "Dim All the Lights" was nominated for Best Female R&B Vocal Performance and the album itself was nominated for Album of the Year and Best Female Pop Vocal Performance. The album was also nominated for "Favourite Pop/Rock Album" at the American Music Awards of 1980. The single took an American Music Award for "Favorite Pop/Rock Single", while Summer took awards for "Favorite Pop/Rock Female Artist" & "Favorite Soul/R&B Female Artist". In 2020, the album was ranked at 283 on Rolling Stone's 500 Greatest Albums of All Time list.

Bad Girls would be Summer's final studio album for Casablanca Records, who ended 1979 with the release of a greatest hits double-album. For her next studio album, Summer wanted to branch out into other formats of music but since she and Casablanca could not come to an agreement on her musical direction, Summer opted to sign a new deal with Geffen Records, the then-new label formed by David Geffen. Her first album with Geffen Records was more rock/new wave oriented. In the meantime, Casablanca chose to release more singles from the Bad Girls album into 1980: "Sunset People" and "Walk Away", the latter of which became a moderate hit reaching the top 40. Casablanca/PolyGram also released a special edition compilation entitled Walk Away – Greatest Hits 1977–1980, which featured a selection of her hits from the Bad Girls period and the preceding years. In 2003 Universal Music, owners of the Casablanca/PolyGram back catalogue since 1998, re-issued Bad Girls as a digitally remastered and expanded deluxe edition.

Commercial performance
The album was certified double platinum for sales in excess of 2 million copies in the U.S. on December 1, 1993 (double albums are certified per disc by the RIAA rather than per complete unit). It also became her second consecutive number-one album in the U.S., also spending three weeks at number one in Canada on the RPM 100 national albums chart. It has sold over 4 million copies worldwide.

Track listing
All tracks produced by Giorgio Moroder and Pete Bellotte except "My Baby Understands" by Donna Summer and Juergen Koppers.

Personnel

Musicians
Donna Summer – lead and background vocals, composition, production
Giorgio Moroder – bass guitar, synthesizer, guitar, composition, production
Pete Bellotte – bass guitar, composition, production
Harold Faltermeyer – bass guitar, composition, drums, keyboards, synclavier
Bruce Sudano – synthesizer, composition
Joe Esposito – background vocals, composition
Keith Forsey – background vocals, drums, percussion, composition
Jeff Baxter – guitar (solo on "Hot Stuff")
Bob Conti – percussion, composition
Edward "Eddie" Hokenson – composition
Pamela Quinlan – background vocals
Jai Winding – piano
Jay Graydon, Paul Jackson Jr. – guitar
Al Perkins – steel guitar
Sid Sharp – strings
Scott Edwards, Bob Glaub – bass guitar
Gary Grant, Jerry Hey, Steve Madaio – trumpet
Gary Herbig – saxophone
Dick Hyde, Bill Reichenbach Jr. – trombone
Stephanie Straill, Julia, Maxine Willard – backing vocals

Production
Producers: Giorgio Moroder, Pete Bellotte
Arranged by: Harold Faltermeyer
Recording Engineer: Jürgen Koppers, Steven D. Smith
Assistant Engineer: Carolyn Tapp
Mixing Engineer: Jürgen Koppers
Original Mastering Engineer: Brian Gardner at Allen Zentz Mastering, Hollywood
 recorded and mixed at Rusk Sound studios, Hollywood; January – March 1979
Production manager: Budd Tunick
Art direction: Jeffrey Kent Ayeroff
Design: Jeffrey Kent Ayeroff, Jeri McManus
Photography: Harry Langdon Jr.

Charts

Weekly charts

Year-end charts

Singles

Billboard (North America)

Outside North America

Certifications and sales

See also
List of number-one albums of 1979 (U.S.)
List of number-one R&B albums of 1979 (U.S.)

References

External links
 Bad Girls at Discogs
 Deluxe edition reviews

1979 albums
Donna Summer albums
Albums produced by Giorgio Moroder
Albums produced by Pete Bellotte
Casablanca Records albums